Asesinato en la universidad is a 2018 Spanish historical thriller film  directed by Iñaki Peñafiel, written by Antonio Asencio and Clara Pérez Escrivá and starring Leonor Watling, Patrick Criado and Fernando Soto. It was released on La 1 and it is set in the Universidad de Salamanca in the 16th century.

Cast

Production 
The film was produced by RTVE alongside La Cometa TV, with support from Ayuntamiento de Salamanca and USAL. Shooting locations included Salamanca and Madrid.

Release 
The film landed a pre-screening at the San Sebastián International Film Festival on 27 September 2018. RTVE set a premiere on La 1 for 1 November 2018.

See also 
 List of Spanish films of 2018

References

External links
 

2018 films
2010s historical thriller films
Films set in Spain
Films set in the 16th century
Films shot in Spain
RTVE shows
Spanish television films
Spanish historical thriller films
2010s Spanish films
2010s Spanish-language films
Films shot in the province of Salamanca
Films shot in Madrid